Beluga may refer to:

Animals 
Beluga (sturgeon)
Beluga whale

Vehicles 
Airbus Beluga, a large transport airplane
Airbus BelugaXL, a larger transport airplane
Beluga-class submarine, a class of Russian SSA diesel-electric submarine
USS Beluga (SP-536), a United States Navy patrol boat

Other uses 
Beluga, Alaska
Beluga (restaurant)
Beluga caviar, roe of the beluga sturgeon
 Beluga, a type of lentil
Beluga (vodka)

See also
 Baby Beluga, a 1980 album by Raffi 
Beluga School for Life, a Thai educational non-profit organization
Beluga Shipping, a German company